Ljubiša Đorđević (19 June 1906 – 2 November 1944) was a Serbian footballer. He competed in the men's tournament at the 1928 Summer Olympics. He was executed for supposed collaboration with Nazi Germany following the liberation of Belgrade in 1944.

References

External links
 

1906 births
1944 deaths
Serbian footballers
Yugoslavia international footballers
Olympic footballers of Yugoslavia
Footballers at the 1928 Summer Olympics
Footballers from Belgrade
Association football defenders
Yugoslav footballers
Executed Yugoslav collaborators with Nazi Germany
People killed by Yugoslav Partisans